St. Joseph High School is a high school in Saskatoon, Canada, a part of the University Heights Suburban Centre. St. Joseph High School is part of the Greater Saskatoon Catholic School division. Opened in 1995, it currently has approximately 1000 students. It celebrated 25 years in 2019.

Its current feeder schools are Bishop Filevich Ukrainian Bilingual School, École Cardinal Leger School, Father Robinson School, Holy Family School, Mother Teresa School, St. Augustine School, and St. Volodymyr School.

Sports Teams 
St. Joseph's sports teams are governed by the Saskatoon Secondary Schools Athletic Directorate (SSSAD).

St. Joseph competes in the following sports:

Clubs 
Social Activities 

ACT (Always Consider Tomorrow)

Chess Club

Green Guardians

Best Buddies

Band

Junior Jazz

Senior Jazz

SRC (Student Representative Council)

Band Concert

Choral

Grade 9-12 Concert Choir

Chamber Choir

Drama

Musical Theatre

Fall Production

One Act Plays

Light & Sound

Promotions

Make-up

Sets & Stage

Variety Night

'International Travel'

Outdoor Education Club

Rosary Club

Rubik Cube Club

Student Representative Council

Soul Seekers

Yearbook 

Driver Education

Notable alumni
Colby Armstrong, former NHL forward, current hockey analyst for Rogers Sportsnet
Riley Armstrong, former NHL forward
Eric Gryba, former NHL defenceman
Brayden Schenn, NHL forward for the St. Louis Blues, 1 time Stanley Cup Champion (2019)
Luke Schenn, NHL defenceman for the Vancouver Canucks, 2 time Stanley Cup Champion (2020, 2021)
Jarret Stoll, former NHL forward, 2 time Stanley Cup Champion (2012,2014)
Brett Boyko, CFL offensive guard for the Saskatchewan Roughriders
Jorgen Hus, former Seattle Seahawks longsnapper current longsnapper for the Saskatchewan Roughriders

External links
 Official website
 Greater Saskatoon Catholic Schools Official

References

High schools in Saskatoon
Catholic secondary schools in Saskatchewan
Educational institutions established in 1995
1995 establishments in Saskatchewan